Abdülhamid or Abdul Hamid II (21 September 1842 10 February 1918) was the sultan of the Ottoman Empire from 31 August 1876 to 27 April 1909, and the last sultan to exert effective control over the fracturing state. The time period which he reigned in the Ottoman Empire is known as the Hamidian Era. He oversaw a period of decline, with rebellions (particularly in the Balkans), and he presided over an unsuccessful war with the Russian Empire (1877–1878) followed by a successful war against the Kingdom of Greece in 1897, though Ottoman gains were tempered by subsequent Western European intervention.

In accordance with an agreement made with the Republican Young Ottomans, he promulgated the Ottoman Empire's first Constitution, which was a sign of progressive thinking that marked his early rule. However, in 1878, citing disagreements with the Ottoman Parliament, he suspended both the short-lived constitution and the parliament. The modernization of the Ottoman Empire continued during his reign, including reform of the bureaucracy, the extension of the Rumelia Railway and of the Anatolia Railway, and the construction of the Baghdad Railway and of the Hejaz Railway. In addition, systems for population registration and control over the press were established, along with the first local modern law-school in 1898. The most far-reaching of the reforms occurred in education: many professional schools were established for fields including the law, arts, trades, civil engineering, veterinary medicine, customs, farming, and linguistics. Although Abdul Hamid II closed Istanbul University in 1881, it re-opened in 1900, and a network of secondary, primary, and military schools was extended throughout the empire. German firms played a major role in developing the Empire's railway and telegraph-systems. This modernization cost the empire its economic sovereignty, as its finances came under control of the Great Powers through the Ottoman Public Debt Administration.

During Abdul Hamid's reign the Ottoman Empire became known for the massacres of Armenians and Assyrians of 1894–1896. Many attempts were made on Abdul Hamid's life during his reign. Amongst the many assassination attempts against him, one of the most famous is the Yıldız assassination attempt of 1905 by the Armenian Revolutionary Federation. Large sections of the Ottoman intelligentsia also sharply criticized and opposed him due to his use of secret police to silence dissent and the Young Turks movement. In 1908, a secret revolutionary Young Turks organization known as the Committee of Union and Progress forced Abdul Hamid II to recall the parliament and reinstate the constitution in the Young Turk Revolution. Abdul Hamid attempted to reassert his absolutism a year later, resulting in his deposition by Unionist forces in an event known as the 31 March Incident in 1909. As a result of his atrocities, he was known as the "Red Sultan" in the West.

Early life

Abdul Hamid II was born on 21 September 1842 in Çırağan Palace, Ortaköy or at Topkapı Palace, both in Istanbul. He was the son of Sultan Abdulmejid I and Tirimüjgan Kadın (Circassia, 20 August 1819Constantinople, Feriye Palace, 2 November 1853), originally named Virjinia. After the death of his mother, he later became the adoptive son of his father's legal wife, Perestu Kadın. Perestu was also the adoptive mother of Abdul Hamid's half-sister Cemile Sultan, whose mother Düzdidil Kadın had died in 1845 leaving her motherless at the age of two. The two were brought up in the same household where they spent their childhood together.

Unlike many other Ottoman sultans, Abdul Hamid II visited distant countries. Nine years before he took the throne, he accompanied his uncle Sultan Abdülaziz on his visit to Paris (30 June–10 July 1867), London (12–23 July 1867), Vienna (28–30 July 1867) and the capitals or cities of a number of other European countries in the summer of 1867 (they departed from Constantinople on 21 June 1867 and returned on 7 August 1867).

Accession to the Ottoman throne

Abdul Hamid ascended to the throne following the deposition of his brother Murad on 31 August 1876. At his accession, some commentators were impressed that he rode practically unattended to the Eyüp Sultan Mosque, where he was given the Sword of Osman. Most people expected Abdul Hamid II to support liberal movements, however, he acceded the throne in 1876 in a very difficult and critical period for the Empire. Economic and political turmoil, local wars in the Balkans, and the Russo-Turkish War (1877–1878) threatened the existence of the Ottoman Empire. Abdul Hamid used these difficult war-filled times to recreate the absolutist regime and to dissolve the parliament, usurping all political power until his overthrow.

First Constitutional Era, 1876–1878

Abdul Hamid worked with the Young Ottomans to realize some form of constitutional arrangement. This new form in its theoretical space could help to realize a liberal transition with Islamic arguments. The Young Ottomans believed that the modern parliamentary system was a restatement of the practice of consultation, or shura, which had existed in early Islam.

In December 1876, due to the 1875 insurrection in Bosnia and Herzegovina, the then-ongoing war with Serbia and Montenegro and the feeling aroused throughout Europe by the cruelty used in stamping out the 1876 Bulgarian rebellion, Abdul Hamid promulgated the constitution and its parliament. The commission to establish a new constitution was headed by Midhat Pasha, and the new constitution was passed by the cabinet on 6 December 1876, giving Abdul Hamid the right to exile anyone he deems a threat to the state and allowed for a bicameral legislature with appointments made by the sultan.

The international Constantinople Conference towards the end of 1876 was surprised by the promulgation of a constitution, but European powers at the conference rejected the constitution as a significant change; they preferred the 1856 constitution (Islâhat Hatt-ı Hümâyûnu) or the 1839 Gülhane edict (Hatt-ı Şerif), but questioned whether there was need for a parliament to act as an official voice of the people.

In any event, like many other would-be reforms of the Ottoman Empire's change, it proved to be nearly impossible. Russia continued to mobilize for war. Early in 1877 the Ottoman Empire went to war with the Russian Empire.

War with Russia

Abdul Hamid's biggest fear, near dissolution, was realized with the Russian declaration of war on 24 April 1877. In that conflict, the Ottoman Empire fought without help from European allies. Russian chancellor Prince Gorchakov had effectively purchased Austrian neutrality with the Reichstadt Agreement by that time. The British Empire, though still fearing the Russian threat to the British presence in India, did not involve itself in the conflict because of public opinion against the Ottomans, following reports of Ottoman brutality in putting down the Bulgarian uprising. The Russian victory was quickly realized; the conflict ended in February 1878. The Treaty of San Stefano, signed at the end of the war, imposed harsh terms: the Ottoman Empire gave independence to Romania, Serbia, and Montenegro; it granted autonomy to Bulgaria; instituted reforms in Bosnia and Herzegovina; and ceded parts of Dobrudzha to Romania and parts of Armenia to Russia, which was also paid an enormous indemnity. After the war with Russia, Abdul Hamid suspended the constitution in February 1878 and dismissed the parliament after its solitary meeting in March 1877. For the next three decades, the Ottoman Empire was ruled by Abdulhamid from Yıldız Palace.

As Russia could dominate the newly independent states, the country's influence in South-eastern Europe was greatly increased by the Treaty of San Stefano. Due to the insistence of the Great Powers (especially the United Kingdom), the treaty was later revised at the Congress of Berlin so as to reduce the great advantages acquired by Russia. In exchange of these favors, Cyprus was ceded to Britain in 1878. There were troubles in Egypt, where a discredited khedive had to be deposed. Abdul Hamid mishandled relations with Urabi Pasha, and as a result Britain gained de facto control over Egypt and Sudan by sending its troops in 1882 to establish control over the two provinces. Cyprus, Egypt, and Sudan remained ostensibly Ottoman provinces until 1914 when Britain officially annexed those territories in response to the Ottoman participation in World War I on the side of the Central Powers.

Hamidian Era

Disintegration 
Abdul Hamid's distrust for the reformist admirals of the Ottoman Navy (whom he suspected of plotting against him and trying to bring back the 1876 constitution) and his subsequent decision to lock the Ottoman fleet (which ranked as the third largest fleet in the world during the reign of his predecessor Abdul Aziz) inside the Golden Horn caused the loss of Ottoman overseas territories and islands in North Africa, the Mediterranean Sea, and the Aegean Sea during and after his reign.

Financial difficulties forced him to consent to foreign control over the Ottoman national debt. In a decree issued in December 1881, a large portion of the empire's revenues were handed over to the Public Debt Administration for the benefit of (mostly foreign) bondholders.

The union in 1885 of Bulgaria with Eastern Rumelia was another blow to the Empire. The creation of an independent and powerful Bulgaria was viewed as a serious threat to the Ottoman Empire. For many years Abdul Hamid had to deal with Bulgaria in a way that did not antagonize either Russian or German wishes. There were also key problems regarding the Albanian question resulting from the Albanian League of Prizren and with the Greek and Montenegrin frontiers where the European powers were determined that the decisions of the Berlin Congress should be carried into effect.

Crete was granted 'extended privileges', but these did not satisfy the population, which sought unification with Greece. In early 1897 a Greek expedition sailed to Crete to overthrow Ottoman rule on the island. This act was followed by war, in which the Ottoman Empire defeated Greece (see the Greco-Turkish War (1897)); however as a result of the Treaty of Constantinople, Crete was taken over en depot by the United Kingdom, France, and Russia. Prince George of Greece was appointed as ruler and Crete was effectively lost to the Ottoman Empire. The ʿAmmiyya, a revolt in 1889–90 among Druze and other Syrians against excesses of the local sheikhs, similarly led to capitulation to the rebels' demands, as well as concessions to Belgian and French companies to provide Beirut and Damascus with a railroad between them.

Political decisions and reforms

Most people expected Abdul Hamid II to have liberal ideas, and some conservatives were inclined to regard him with suspicion as a dangerous reformer. However, despite working with the reformist Young Ottomans while still a crown prince and appearing as a liberal leader, he became increasingly conservative immediately after taking the throne. In a process known as İstibdad, Abdul Hamid succeeded in reducing his ministers to the position of secretaries, and he concentrated much of the Empire's administration into his own hands at Yıldız Palace. Default in the public funds, an empty treasury, the 1875 insurrection in Bosnia and Herzegovina, the war with Serbia and Montenegro, the result of Russo-Turkish war and the feeling aroused throughout Europe by the Abdul Hamid government in stamping out the Bulgarian rebellion all contributed to his apprehension for enacting significant changes.

His push for education resulted in the establishment of 18 professional schools, and in 1900, Darulfunun, now known as Istanbul University, was established. He also created a large system of secondary, primary, and military schools throughout the empire. 51 secondary schools were constructed in a 12-year period (1882–1894). As the goal of the educational reforms in the Hamidian era were to counter foreign influence, these secondary schools utilized European teaching techniques, yet instilled within students a strong sense of Ottoman identity and Islamic morality.

Abdul Hamid also reorganized the Ministry of Justice and developed rail and telegraph systems. The telegraph system expanded to incorporate the furthest parts of the Empire. Railways connected Constantinople and Vienna by 1883, and shortly afterward the Orient Express connected Paris to Constantinople. During his rule, railways within the Ottoman Empire expanded to connect Ottoman-controlled Europe and Anatolia with Constantinople as well. The increased ability to travel and communicate within the Ottoman Empire served to strengthen Constantinople's influence over the rest of the Empire.

Abdul Hamid took tight measures for his security. The memory of the deposition of Abdul Aziz was on his mind and convinced him that a constitutional government was not a good idea. Because of this, information was tightly controlled and the press was tightly censored. A secret police (Umur-u Hafiye) and a network of informants was present throughout the empire, and many politicians of the Second Constitutional Era and the future Turkish Republic experienced arrest and exile. The curriculum of schools was subject to close inspection to prevent dissidence. Ironically, the schools that Abdul Hamid founded and tried to control became "breeding grounds of discontent" as students and teachers alike chafed at the clumsy restrictions of the censors.

Armenian Question

Starting around 1890, Armenians began demanding the implementation of the reforms which were promised to them at the Berlin conference. To prevent such measures, in 1890–91, Sultan Abdul Hamid gave semi-official status to the Kurdish bandits who were already actively mistreating the Armenians in the provinces. Made up of Kurds (as well as other ethnic groups such as Turcomans), and armed by the state, they came to be called the Hamidiye Alayları ("Hamidian Regiments"). The Hamidiye and Kurdish brigands were given free rein to attack Armenians, confiscating stores of grain, foodstuffs, and driving off livestock, and confident of escaping punishment as they were subject only to court-martial. In the face of such violence, the Armenians established revolutionary organizations, namely the Social Democrat Hunchakian Party (Hunchak; founded in Switzerland in 1887) and the Armenian Revolutionary Federation (the ARF or Dashnaktsutiun, founded in 1890 in Tiflis). Clashes ensued and unrest occurred in 1892 at Merzifon and in 1893 at Tokat. Abdul Hamid II did not hesitate to put down these revolts with harsh methods while using the local Muslims (in most cases Kurds) against the Armenians. As a result of such violence, 300,000 Armenians were killed in what became known as the Hamidian massacres. News of the Armenian massacres was widely reported in Europe and the United States and drew strong responses from foreign governments and humanitarian organizations alike. Hence, Abdul Hamid II was referred to as the "Bloody Sultan" or "Red Sultan" in the West. On 21 July 1905, the Armenian Revolutionary Federation attempted to assassinate him with a car bombing during a public appearance, but the Sultan was delayed for a minute and the bomb went off too early, killing 26, wounding 58 (of which four died during their treatment in a hospital) and destroying 17 cars. This continued aggression, along with the handling of the Armenian desire for reforms, led to the western European powers taking a more hands-on approach with the Turks.

America and the Philippines

Sultan Abdul Hamid II, after being approached by American minister to Turkey, Oscar Straus, sent a letter to the Moros of the Sulu Sultanate telling them not to resist American takeover and to cooperate with the Americans at the start of the Moro Rebellion. The Sulu Moros complied with the order.

John Hay, the American Secretary of State, asked Straus in 1898 to approach Sultan Abdul Hamid II to request that the Sultan (who was also Caliph) write a letter to the Moro Sulu Muslims of the Sulu Sultanate in the Philippines telling them to submit to American suzerainty and American military rule. The Sultan obliged them and wrote the letter, which was sent to Sulu via Mecca where two Sulu chiefs brought it home to Sulu, and it was successful, since the "Sulu Mohammedans ... refused to join the insurrectionists and had placed themselves under the control of our army, thereby recognizing American sovereignty." The Ottoman Sultan used his position as caliph to order the Sulu Sultan not to resist and not fight the Americans when they became subject to American control. President McKinley did not mention Turkey's role in the pacification of the Sulu Moros in his address to the first session of the Fifty-sixth Congress in December 1899, since the agreement with the Sultan of Sulu was not submitted to the Senate until 18 December. Despite Sultan Abdul Hamid's "pan-Islamic" ideology, he readily acceded to a request by Straus for help in telling the Sulu Muslims to not resist America since he felt no need to cause hostilities between the West and Muslims. Collaboration between the American military and Sulu sultanate was due to the Sulu Sultan being persuaded by the Ottoman Sultan. John P. Finley wrote that:

Abdul Hamid in his position as Caliph was approached by the Americans to help them deal with Muslims during their war in the Philippines, and the Muslim people of the area obeyed the order sent by Abdul Hamid to help the Americans.

The Bates Treaty, which the Americans had signed with the Moro Sulu Sultanate and which guaranteed the Sultanate's autonomy in its internal affairs and governance, was then violated by the Americans, who then invaded Moroland, causing the Moro Rebellion to break out in 1904 with war raging between the Americans and Moro Muslims and atrocities committed against Moro Muslim women and children, such as the Moro Crater Massacre.

Germany's support

The Triple Entente – the United Kingdom, France and Russia – maintained strained relations with the Ottoman Empire. Abdul Hamid and his close advisors believed the Empire should be treated as an equal player by these great powers. In the Sultan's view, the Ottoman Empire was a European empire, distinct for having more Muslims than Christians.

Over time the hostile diplomatic attitudes shown from France (the occupation of Tunisia in 1881) and Great Britain (the 1882 establishment of de facto control in Egypt) caused Abdul Hamid to gravitate towards Germany. Kaiser Wilhelm II was twice hosted by Abdul Hamid in Istanbul; first on 21 October 1889, and nine years later, on 5 October 1898. (Wilhelm II later visited Constantinople for a third time, on 15 October 1917, as a guest of Mehmed V). German officers (like Baron von der Goltz and Bodo-Borries von Ditfurth) were employed to oversee the organization of the Ottoman army.

German government officials were brought in to reorganize the Ottoman government's finances. Additionally, the German Emperor was rumored in counseling Hamid II in his controversial decision to appoint his third son as his successor. Germany's friendship was not altruistic; it had to be fostered with railway and loan concessions. In 1899, a significant German desire, the construction of a Berlin-Baghdad railway, was granted.

Kaiser Wilhelm II of Germany also requested the Sultan's help when having trouble with Chinese Muslim troops. During the Boxer Rebellion, the Chinese Muslim Kansu Braves fought against the German Army, routing them, along with the other Eight Nation Alliance forces. The Muslim Kansu Braves and Boxers defeated the Alliance forces led by the German Captain Guido von Usedom at the Battle of Langfang in the Seymour Expedition in 1900 and besieged the trapped Alliance forces during the Siege of the International Legations. It was only on the second attempt in the Gasalee Expedition, that the Alliance forces managed to get through to battle the Chinese Muslim troops at the Battle of Peking. Kaiser Wilhelm was so alarmed by the Chinese Muslim troops that he requested that Abdul Hamid find a way to stop the Muslim troops from fighting. Abdul Hamid agreed to the Kaiser's demands and sent Enver Pasha to China in 1901, but the rebellion was over by that time. Because the Ottomans did not want conflict against the European nations and because the Ottoman Empire was ingratiating itself to gain German assistance, an order imploring Chinese Muslims to avoid assisting the Boxers was issued by the Ottoman Khalifa and reprinted in Egyptian and Muslim Indian newspapers.

Young Turk Revolution 

The national humiliation of the Macedonian conflict, together with the resentment in the army against the palace spies and informers, at last brought matters to a crisis. The Committee of Union and Progress (CUP), a Young Turks organization that was especially influential in the Rumelian army units undertook the Young Turk Revolution in the summer of 1908. Abdul Hamid, upon learning that the troops in Salonica were marching on Istanbul (23 July), at once capitulated. On 24 July an irade announced the restoration of the suspended constitution of 1876; the next day, further irades abolished espionage and censorship, and ordered the release of political prisoners.

On 17 December, Abdul Hamid opened the Ottoman parliament with a speech from the throne in which he said that the first parliament had been "temporarily dissolved until the education of the people had been brought to a sufficiently high level by the extension of instruction throughout the empire."

Deposition

The new attitude of the sultan did not save himself from the suspicion of intriguing with the powerful reactionary elements in the state, a suspicion confirmed by his attitude towards the counter-revolution of 13 April 1909 known as the 31 March Incident, when an insurrection of the soldiers backed by a conservative upheaval in some parts of the military in the capital overthrew Hüseyin Hilmi Pasha's government. With the Young Turks driven out of the capital, Abdul Hamid appointed ahmet Tevfik Pasha in his place, and once again suspended the Constitution and shuttered the parliament. However the Sultan was only in control of Constantinople while the Young Turks were still influential in the rest of the Army and provinces. The CUP appealed to Mahmud Shevket Pasha to restore the status quo, who organized an ad hoc formation known as the Action Army which marched on Constantinople. Şevket Pasha's Chief of Staff was captain Mustafa Kemal. The Action Army stopped by first in Aya Stefanos, and negotiated with the rival government established by deputies who escaped from the capital, led by Mehmed Talat. It was secretly decided there that Abdul Hamid had to be deposed. When the Action Army entered Istanbul, a Fatwa was issued condemning Abdul Hamid, and the parliament voted to dethrone him. On 27 April Abdul Hamid's half-brother Reshad Efendi was proclaimed as Sultan Mehmed V.

The Sultan's countercoup, which had appealed to conservative Islamists against the Young Turks' liberal reforms, resulted in the massacre of tens of thousands of Christian Armenians in the Adana province, known as the Adana massacre.

Post deposition

The ex-sultan was conveyed into captivity at Salonica (now Thessaloniki), mostly at the Villa Allatini in the city’s southern outskirts. In 1912, when Salonica fell to Greece, he was returned to captivity in Constantinople. He spent his last days studying, practicing carpentry and writing his memoirs in custody at Beylerbeyi Palace in the Bosphorus, in the company of his wives and children, where he died on 10 February 1918, just a few months before his brother the reigning sultan Mehmed V. He was buried in Istanbul.

In 1930, his nine widows and thirteen children were granted US$50 million from his estate, following a lawsuit that lasted five years. His estate was worth US$1.5 billion.

Abdul Hamid was the last Sultan of the Ottoman Empire to hold absolute power. He presided over 33 years of decline, during which other European countries regarded the empire as the "sick man of Europe."

Pan-Islamism 

Abdul Hamid believed that the ideas of Tanzimat could not bring the disparate peoples of the empire to a common identity, such as Ottomanism. He adopted a new ideological principle, Pan-Islamism; since Ottoman sultans beginning with 1517 were also nominally Caliphs, he wanted to promote that fact and emphasized the Ottoman Caliphate. He saw the huge diversity of ethnicities in the Ottoman Empire and believed that Islam was the only way to unite his Muslim people.

He encouraged Pan-Islamism, telling Muslims living under European powers to unite into one polity. This threatened several European countries, namely Austria through Bosnian Muslims, Russia through Tatars and Kurds, France and Spain through Moroccan Muslims, and Britain through Indian Muslims. The privileges of foreigners in the Ottoman Empire, which were an obstacle to an effective government, were curtailed. At the very end of his reign, he finally provided funds to start construction of the strategically important Constantinople-Baghdad Railway and the Constantinople-Medina Railway, making the trip to Mecca for Hajj more efficient. After he was deposed, the construction of both railways was accelerated and completed by the Young Turks. Missionaries were sent to distant countries preaching Islam and the Caliph's supremacy. During his rule, Abdul Hamid refused Theodor Herzl's offers to pay down a substantial portion of the Ottoman debt (150 million pounds sterling in gold) in exchange for a charter allowing the Zionists to settle in Palestine. He is famously quoted as telling Herzl's Emissary that "as long as I am alive, I will not have our body divided, only our corpse they can divide."

Pan-Islamism was a considerable success. After the Greco-Ottoman war, many Muslims celebrated the victory and saw the Ottoman victory as Muslims' victory. Uprisings, lockouts, and objections against European colonization in newspapers were reported in Muslim regions after the war. However, Abdul Hamid's appeals to Muslim sentiment were not always very effective due to widespread disaffection within the Empire. In Mesopotamia and Yemen disturbance was endemic; nearer home, a semblance of loyalty was maintained in the army and among the Muslim population only by a system of deflation and espionage.

Personal life
Abdul Hamid II was a skilled carpenter and personally crafted some high-quality furniture, which can be seen today at the Yıldız Palace, Şale Köşkü and Beylerbeyi Palace in Istanbul. He was also interested in opera and personally wrote the first-ever Ottoman Turkish translations of many opera classics. He also composed several opera pieces for the Mızıka-yı Hümâyun (Ottoman Imperial Band/Orchestra, which was established by his grandfather Mahmud II who had appointed Donizetti Pasha as its Instructor General in 1828), and hosted the famous performers of Europe at the Opera House of Yıldız Palace, which was restored in the 1990s and featured in the 1999 film Harem Suare (the film begins with the scene of Abdul Hamid II watching a performance). One of his guests included the world renowned French stage actress Sarah Bernhardt who performed for audiences.

He was also a good wrestler of Yağlı güreş and a 'patron saint' of the wrestlers. He organized wrestling tournaments in the empire and selected wrestlers were invited to the palace. Abdul Hamid personally tried the sportsmen and good ones remained in the palace. He was also a skilled drawer, having drawn the sole known portrait of his fourth wife Bidar Kadın. He was extremely fond of Sherlock Holmes novels, and awarded its author Sir Arthur Conan Doyle the Order of the Medjidie 2nd Class in 1907.

Religion
Sultan Abdul Hamid II was a practitioner of traditional Islamic Sufism. He was influenced by Libyan Shadhili Madani Sheikh, Muhammad Zafir al-Madani whose lessons he would attend in disguise in Unkapani before he became Sultan. Abdul Hamid II asked Sheikh al-Madani to return to Istanbul after he ascended the throne. The sheik initiated Shadhili gatherings of remembrance (dhikr) in the newly commissioned Yıldız Hamidiye Mosque; on Thursday evenings he would accompany Sufi masters in reciting dhikr. He also became a close religious and political confidant of the Sultan. In 1879, the Sultan excused the taxes of all of the Caliphate's Madani Sufi lodges (also known as zawiyas and tekkes). In 1888, he even established a Sufi lodge for the Madani order of Shadhili Sufism in Istanbul, which he commissioned as part of the Ertuğrul Tekke mosque. The relationship of the Sultan and the sheik lasted for thirty years until the latter's death in 1903.

Poetry
Abdul Hamid wrote poetry, following on the footsteps of many other Ottoman sultans. One of his poems translates thus:

Impressions
In the opinion of F. A. K. Yasamee:

Family
Abdülhamid II had numerous consorts, but allowed none of them, by his explicit will, to have political influence; in the same way he did not allow his adoptive mother, Rahime Perestu Sultan, for whom he also had the utmost respect, or the other female members of his family to have such influence, although some of them still had some degree of power in private or in the daily life of the harem. This is because Abdülhamid was convinced that the reigns of his predecessors, especially those of his uncle Abdülaziz and his father Abdülmecid I, had been ruined by the excessive meddling of the women of the imperial family in the affairs of state. The only partial exception was Cemile Sultan, his half-sister and adoptive sister.

Consorts
Abdülhamid II had at least sixteen consorts:
 Nazikeda Kadın (1848 - 11 April 1895).  BaşKadin (First Consort). She was an Abkhazian princess, born Mediha Hanim, lady-in-waiting of Cemile Sultan. She died prematurely after years of deep depression, due to the tragic death of her only daughter. She had a daughter.
Safinaz Nurefsun Kadın (1850 - 1915). Her real name was Ayşe and she was the younger sister of the last consort of Abdülmecid I, Yıldız Hanım. When Yıldız Hanım married Abdülmecid, Ayşe was sent to the service of  Şehzade Abdülaziz, where she was renamed Safinaz. According to Harun Açba, Abdülaziz was fascinated by her beauty and wanted to marry her, but she refused because she was in love with Şehzade Abdülhamid (future Abdülhamid II). The feeling was mutual and the young prince asked for the help of his stepmother  Rahime Perestu Kadin. She told Abdülaziz that Safinaz was ill and that she needed a change of air; later, Abdülaziz was informed of her death. Abdülhamid then married Safinaz, renamed Nurefsun, in secret, in October 1868. However, she could not get used to life in the  harem and wanted to be Abdülhamid's only consort. She then asked for a divorce, which he was granted to her in 1879. She had no children.
Bedrifelek Kadın (1851 - 1930). Circassian Princess who took refuge in Istanbul when Russia invaded the Caucasus. She ruled Abdülhamid II's harem when Rahime Perestu Sultan died. She left Abdülhamid when he was deposed, perhaps disappointed that their son had not been chosen as successor. She had two sons and a daughter.
 Bidar Kadın (5 May 1855 - 13 January 1918). Kabartian princess, she was considered the most beautiful and charming of Abdülhamid II's consorts. She had a son and a daughter.
Dilpesend Kadın (16 January 1865 - 17 June 1901). Georgian. She was educated by Tiryal Hanim, last consort of Mahmud II, who was Abdülhamid II's grandfather. She had two daughters.
Mezidemestan Kadın (3 March 1869 - 21 January 1909). She was born Kadriye Kamile Merve Hanim, she was the aunt of Emine Nazikeda Kadın, future consort of Mehmed VI. She was loved by everyone, including his other consorts and her stepchildren. She was the most influential of his consorts, but she never abused her power of hers. She had a son, Abdülhamid's favorite.
Emsalinur Kadın (1866 - 1952). She entered at Palace with her sister Tesrid Hanım, who became a consort of Şehzade Ibrahim Tevfik. She was very beautiful. She did not follow Abdülhamid II into exile and died in poverty. She had a daughter.
 Destizer Müşfika Kadın (1872 - 18 July 1961). She was Abkhazian, born Ayşe Hanim. She grew up with her sister under the tutelage of Pertevniyal Sultan, mother of Sultan  Abdülaziz, uncle of Abdülhamid II. She followed Abdülhamid into exile and was with him until his death, so much so that it is said that the sultan died in her arms. She had a daughter.
Sazkar Hanım (8 May 1873 - 1945). She was a noble abkhazian, born Fatma Zekiye Hanım. She was among the consorts who followed Abdülhamid II into exile, and later left Turkey with her daughter. She had a daughter.
Peyveste Hanım (1873 - 1943). Abkhazian princess, born Hatice Rabia Hanim and aunt of Leyla Açba. She served Nazikeda Kadın with her sisters before and then became the treasurer of the harem. She was highly respected. She followed her husband into exile and then her son. She had a son.
Pesend Hanım (13 February 1876 - 5 November 1924). Born princess Fatma Kadriye Achba, she was one of his favorite consorts, known for her kindness, charity and tolerance. She was one of the consorts who stayed with Abdülhamid II until his death and, on his death, she cut her hair and threw it into the sea as a sign of mourning. She had a daughter.
Behice Hanım (10 October 1882 - 22 October 1969). She was Sazkar Hanım's cousin and her real name was Behiye Hanim. She was arrogant and proud, she initially she had to marry Şehzade Mehmed Burhaneddin, son of Abdülhamid II, but in the end the sultan decided to marry her himself, against the will of Behice herself. She had two twin sons.
Saliha Naciye Kadın (1887 - 1923). She was born Zeliha Hanım and called also Atike Naciye Kadın. Known for her kindness and modesty, she was his favorite and among her consorts who stayed with him until his death. She had a son and a daughter.
Dürdane Hanım (1867 - January 1957). 
Calibös Hanım (1880 - ?).
Nazlıyar Hanım.

Sons
Abdülhamid II had at least eight sons:  
Şehzade Mehmed Selim (11 January 1870 - 5 May 1937) - with Bedrifelek Kadın. He didn't get along with his father. He had eight consorts, two sons and a daughter.
Şehzade Mehmed Abdülkadir (16 January 1878 - 16 March 1944) - with Bidar Kadın. He had seven consorts, five sons and two daughters.
Şehzade Ahmed Nuri (12 February 1878 - 7 August 1944) - with Bedrifelek Kadın. He had a consort but no child.
Şehzade Mehmed Burhaneddin (19 December 1885 - 15 June 1949) - with Mezidemestan Kadın. He had four consorts and two sons.
Şehzade Abdürrahim Hayri (15 August 1894 - 1 January 1952) - with Peyveste Hanım. He had two consorts, a son and a daughter.
Şehzade Ahmed Nureddin (June 22, 1901 - December 1944) - with Behice Hanım. Twin of Şehzade Mehmed Bedreddin. He had a consort and a son.
Şehzade Mehmed Bedreddin (22 June 1901 - 13 October 1903) - with Behice Hanım. Twin of Şehzade Ahmed Nureddin. Born in Yıldız Palace. He died of meningitis and was buried in the Yahya Efendi cemetery.
Şehzade Mehmed Abid (May 17, 1905 - December 8, 1973) - with Saliha Naciye Kadın. He had two consorts but no children.

Daughters
Abdülhamid II had at least thirteen daughters:  
Ulviye Sultan (1868 - 5 October 1875) - with Nazikeda Kadın. Born in Dolmabahçe Palace, she died at the age of seven in an extremely tragic way: while her mother played the piano and their servants were dismissed for the meal, Ulviye Sultan began to play with matches or candles. Her dress caught fire and her gold belt trapped her inside it, even though her mother burned her hands trying to unhook it. In panic, Nazikeda picked up her daughter and ran down the stairs, screaming for help, but the movement fueled the flames and Ulviye Sultan died burnt alive, leaving her mother in total despair, from which she never recovered. She was buried in the Yeni Cami.
Zekiye Sultan (12 January 1872 - 13 July 1950) - with Bedrifelek Kadın. She married once and had two daughters. She was one of Abdülhamid's favorite daughters. 
 Fatma Naime Sultan (5 September 1876 - 1945) - with Bidar Kadın. She is the favorite daughter of Abdülhamid II, who called her "my accession daughter", because she was born close to the date of his accession to the throne. She married twice and had a son and a daughter. In 1904 she was embroiled in a scandal when she discovered that her first husband was cheating on her with her cousin Hatice Sultan, daughter of Murad V.
Naile Sultan (9 February 1884 - 25 October 1957) - with Dilpesend Kadın. She married once, with no children.
Seniye Sultan (1884 - 1884) - unknown motherhood.  
Seniha Sultan (1885 - 1885) - with Dilpesend Kadın. She died at five months. 
Şadiye Sultan (30 November 1886 - 20 November 1977) - with Emsalinur Kadın. She married twice and had a daughter.
Hamide Ayşe Sultan (15 November 1887 - 10 August 1960) - with Müşfika Kadın. She was married twice and had three sons and a daughter.
Refia Sultan (15 June 1891 - 1938) - with Sazkar Hanım. She married once and had two daughters.
Hatice Sultan (10 July 1897 - 14 February 1898) - with Pesend Hanım. She died of smallpox, buried in the Yahya Efendi cemetery.
Aliye Sultan (1900 - 1900) - unknown motherhood. She died a few days after her birth.
Cemile Sultan (1900 - 1900) - unknown maternity. She died a few days after her birth.
Samiye Sultan (16 January 1908 - 24 January 1909) - with Saliha Naciye Kadın. She died of pneumonia, buried in the  mausoleum Şehzade Ahmed Kemaleddin in the Yahya Efendi cemetery.

In popular culture 

 Abdul the Damned (1935) portrays a time near the end of the sultan's life.
 Payitaht Abdulhamid, named 'The Last Emperor' in English, is a Turkish popular historical television drama series depicting the last 13 years of the reign of Abdul Hamid II.
 In Don Rosa's comic book story "The Treasury of Croesus," Scrooge McDuck pulls out a permit which Abdul Hamid II signed in 1905, allowing McDuck carte blanche to excavate the ancient ruins of Ephesus.

Awards and honours

 Ottoman orders
  Grand Master of the Order of the Crescent
  Grand Master of the Order of Glory
  Grand Master of the Order of the Medjidie
  Grand Master of the Order of Osmanieh

 Foreign orders and decorations
  Knight Grand Cross of the Order of Saint Stephen, in Diamonds, 1881 (Austria-Hungary)
  Knight of the Order of the Elephant,  13 December 1884 (Kingdom of Denmark)
  Knight of the Order of the Seraphim, in Diamonds, 24 July 1879 (Kingdom of Sweden)
  Knight Grand Cross of the Order of Kamehameha I, July 1881 (Kingdom of Hawaii)
  Knight Grand Cross of the Order of Saint Olav, 11 February 1885 (Kingdom of Norway)
  Knight Grand Cross of the Order of the Tower and Sword (Kingdom of Portugal)
  Knight of the Order of the Golden Fleece, 19 December 1880 (Kingdom of Spain)
  Knight Grand Cross of the Order of the White Falcon, 1891 (Grand Duchy of Saxe-Weimar-Eisenach)
  Knight Grand Cross with Collar of the Order of Saint Alexander, 1897 (Principality of Bulgaria)
  Knight Grand Cross with Collar of the Order of Carol I, 1907 (Kingdom of Romania)
  Knight of the Order of the Annunciation, 29 November 1881 (Kingdom of Italy)
  Knight of the Order of the Black Eagle, in Diamonds, 3 February 1882 (German Empire)
  Knight of the Order of the Royal House of Chakri, 18 December 1892 (Kingdom of Siam)
  Knight Grand Cordon of the Order of the Chrysanthemum, 26 June 1888 (Empire of Japan)
  Knight of the Order of Saint Hubert, 1908 (Kingdom of Bavaria)

Gallery
Threatened by several assassination attempts, Abdul Hamid II did not travel often (though still more than many previous rulers). Photographs provided visual evidence of what was taking place in his realm. He commissioned thousands of photographs of his empire including from the Constantinople studio of Jean Pascal Sébah. The Sultan presented large gift albums of photographs to various governments and heads of state, including the United States and Great Britain. The American collection is housed in the Library of Congress and has been digitized.

See also

References

Citations

Sources

Abdul Hamid II Biography
All Documents about Abdul Hamid in English from a Turkish Web Site 
Overy, Richard. The Times Complete History of the World, HarperCollins  (2010)

Further reading

External links

II. Abdul Hamid Forum in English  II. Abdul Hamid Forum in English
II. Abdülhamit Dönemi Olayları – ittihat Ve Terakki Ödev Sitesi
US Library of Congress Abdul Hamid II Photo Collection – about 1,800 photographs mounted in albums, ca. 1880–1893

 
1842 births
1918 deaths
Dethroned monarchs
19th-century Ottoman sultans
20th-century Ottoman sultans
Ottoman people of the Russo-Turkish War (1877–1878)
Ottoman people of the Greco-Turkish War (1897)
Turks from the Ottoman Empire
People from the Ottoman Empire of Circassian descent
Knights of the Golden Fleece of Spain
Grand Crosses of the Order of Saint Stephen of Hungary